The Roman Catholic Archdiocese of Juiz de Fora is an archdiocese located in the city of Juiz de Fora in Brazil.

History
 February 1, 1924: Established as Diocese of Juiz de Fora from the Metropolitan Archdiocese of Mariana
 April 14, 1962: Promoted as Metropolitan Archdiocese of Juiz de Fora

Bishops

Ordinaries, in reverse chronological order
 Archbishops of Juiz de Fora (Roman rite)
 Archbishop Gil Antônio Moreira (2009.01.28 -
 Archbishop Eurico dos Santos Veloso (2001.11.28 – 2009.01.28)
 Archbishop Clóvis Frainer, O.F.M. Cap. (1991.05.22 – 2001.11.28)
 Archbishop Juvenal Roriz, C.Ss.R. (1978.05.05 – 1990.02.07)
 Archbishop Geraldo María de Morais Penido (1962.04.14 – 1977.12.01), appointed Coadjutor Archbishop of Aparecida, São Paulo
 Bishops of Juiz de Fora (Roman Rite) 
 Bishop Geraldo María de Morais Penido (later Archbishop) (1958.06.09 – 1962.04.14)
 Bishop Justino José de Sant'Ana (1924.07.04 – 1958.06.09)

Coadjutor bishop
Geraldo María de Morais Penido (1957-1958)

Auxiliary bishops
Othon Motta (1953-1955), appointed Auxiliary Bishop of São Sebastião do Rio de Janeiro
Altivo Pacheco Ribeiro (1973-1987)
Eurico dos Santos Veloso (1987-1991), appointed Coadjutor Bishop of Luz, Minas Gerais (later returned here as Archbishop)
Paulo Francisco Machado (2004-2008), appointed Bishop of Uberlândia, Minas Gerais

Other priests of this diocese who became bishops
José Eugênio Corrêa, appointed Bishop of Caratinga, Minas Gerais in 1957
Walmor Oliveira de Azevedo, appointed Auxiliary Bishop of São Salvador da Bahia in 1998
Eduardo Benes de Sales Rodrigues, appointed Auxiliary Bishop of Porto Alegre, Rio Grande do Sul in 1998
João Justino de Medeiros Silva, appointed Auxiliary Bishop of Belo Horizonte, Minas Gerais in 2011
Roberto José da Silva, appointed Bishop of Janaúba, Minas Gerais in 2019

Suffragan dioceses
 Diocese of Leopoldina 
 Diocese of São João del Rei

References

Sources
 GCatholic.org
 Catholic Hierarchy
 Archdiocese website (Portuguese)

Roman Catholic dioceses in Brazil
Roman Catholic ecclesiastical provinces in Brazil
Christian organizations established in 1924
 
Roman Catholic dioceses and prelatures established in the 20th century